A list of Spanish-produced and co-produced feature films released in Spain in 1990.

Films

Box office 
The five highest-grossing Spanish films in 1990, by domestic box office gross revenue, are as follows:

See also 
 5th Goya Awards
 1990 in film

Notes

References

External links
 Spanish films of 1990 at the Internet Movie Database

1990
Spanish
Films